John Robert Cryer (born 11 April 1964) is a British Labour Party politician who has been the Member of Parliament (MP) for Leyton and Wanstead since the general election in May 2010. He was previously MP for Hornchurch from 1997 until his defeat at the 2005 general election. He is the Chair of the Parliamentary Labour Party.

Early life and education 
Cryer is the son of Ann Cryer and Bob Cryer, both former Labour MPs. As a child he appeared as an extra in the film The Railway Children (1970).

A journalist by profession, Cryer was educated at Oakbank School, Keighley, Hatfield Polytechnic and the London College of Printing.

Political career 
Cryer was on the left wing of the Labour Party and was a member of the Socialist Campaign Group until he resigned from the group in 2015.

He has worked for Tribune, the Morning Star, ASLEF and the Transport and General Workers Union (now Unite).

Cryer describes himself as a Eurosceptic, and was one of only a small number of Labour MPs who campaigned and voted for the UK to leave the European Union in the 2016 referendum. He consistently opposed holding a second referendum on EU membership. His seat was targeted by the Pro-EU Liberal Democrats in the 2019 general election for his support for Brexit.

As Member of Parliament for Hornchurch, Cryer had a record as a rebel. He voted against tuition fees and top-up fees for higher education, against cuts in lone parent benefits (the first major rebellion under the Blair government) and against the Iraq War. He lost this marginal seat in 2005, before being selected to succeed Harry Cohen in Leyton and Wanstead, a safe Labour seat; he comfortably retained it for the party at the 2010 general election.

Cryer was one of 16 signatories of an open letter to Ed Miliband in January 2015 calling on the party to commit to oppose further austerity, take rail franchises back into public ownership and strengthen collective bargaining arrangements.

On 9 February 2015, Cryer was elected, unopposed, to succeed Dave Watts as the Chair of the Parliamentary Labour Party.

On 8 May 2015, Cryer was re-elected as MP for the Leyton and Wanstead constituency with 58.6% of the vote. On 8 June 2017, he was re-elected as MP for the Leyton and Wanstead constituency with 69.8% of the vote.

In July 2019, following the BBC Panorama programme "Is Labour Antisemitic?", Cryer condemned his party's attack on former staff whistleblowers who had appeared in the programme as "a gross misjudgment".

Personal life 
Cryer's second wife is Ellie Reeves, the Labour MP for Lewisham West and Penge, whose sister is Rachel Reeves, the current Shadow Chancellor of the Exchequer as of November 2022.

References

External links

Profile: John Cryer, BBC News, 22 October 2002
Leyton & Wanstead Labour

|-

|-

1964 births
Living people
Alumni of the University of Hertfordshire
Labour Party (UK) MPs for English constituencies
Labour Party (UK) officials
UK MPs 1997–2001
UK MPs 2001–2005
UK MPs 2010–2015
UK MPs 2015–2017
UK MPs 2017–2019
UK MPs 2019–present
British Eurosceptics
Spouses of British politicians